孫悟空 or 孙悟空 may refer to:

Sun Wukong or Monkey King, the main character in the classical Chinese epic novel Journey to the West
Son Goku (disambiguation), the Japanese transliteration

See also
Wukong (disambiguation)

ja:孫悟空 (曖昧さ回避)